Suhindol Municipality is a small municipality (obshtina) in Veliko Tarnovo Province, central-north Bulgaria, located in the transition between the Danubian Plain and the area of the so-called Fore-Balkan. It is named after its administrative centre – the town of Suhindol.

The Hemus motorway is planned to cross the area connecting the capital city of Sofia with the port of Varna on the Bulgarian Black Sea Coast.

Settlements 

Suhindol Municipality includes the following 6 places (towns are shown in bold):

Demography 
The following table shows the change of the population during the last four decades.

Vital statistics 
The municipality of Suhindol has a low birth rate combined with a very high death rate, which makes the natural growth negative.

Religion 
According to the latest Bulgarian census of 2011, the religious composition, among those who answered the optional question on religious identification, was the following:

See also
Provinces of Bulgaria
Municipalities of Bulgaria
List of cities and towns in Bulgaria

References

External links
 Official website 

Municipalities in Veliko Tarnovo Province